The siege of Sirhind was fought between the Mughal Empire and Sikh forces in 1710. The Sikhs besieged, stormed, captured, plundered and razed the city of Sirhind after defeating and beheading 
Wazir Khan in the battle of Chappar Chiri.

Background
The city of Sirhind was anathema to the Sikhs who were raged to take vengeance upon the oppressive Mughal regime of Sirhind, under whom the two young children of Guru Gobind Singh were executed on the order of the governor of Sirhind, Wazir Khan and his dewan Sucha Nand. Some prominent towns on the way to Sirhind were captured and plundered including Sonepat, Kaithal, Samana, Shahabad, Mustafabad and Sadhaura, as they could provide military assistance to the Mughal government of Sirhind. Due to consistent victories, many plunderers, looking to prey upon the riches within the walls of Sirhind, also followed Banda Singh Bahadur and his Sikh troops on his march to Sirhind.

Siege
After defeating and killing Wazir Khan in the battle of Chappar Chiri, Banda Singh Bahadur and his forces began their march to Sirhind, roughly 10 miles from the battle field. The gates of the city were closed, and the guns mounted on the wall's forts maintained steady fire on the Sikhs and managed to inflict considerable losses upon them. Fighting resumed on May 13, the fort guns had managed to kill 500 of Banda's troops, in response, the Sikhs fired a deadly volley on the fort gun, rendering it useless and attacked the city's gates, successfully managing to open some of them.

Capture 
On 14 May 1710, Banda and his army entered and captured Sirhind, and an immense destruction of life and property ensued shortly after. Sucha Nand was captured alive and later executed, whereas other Hindus who contributed to the crimes of Wazir Khan were punished. Banda seized two crores worth of government treasury and moveable property which was moved to Lohgarh.

During the expedition 
During the expedition by Banda bahadur's troops, numerous Muslim tombs were spared including the mausoleum of Shaikh Ahmad Mujaddid Alif Sani. 

Historian Yogesh Snehi noted that Banda Singh Bahadur destroyed imperial mosques and the fort of Sirhind during his raid, where the two young sons of Guru Gobind Singh were executed. Historian V.D Mahajan also writes that thousands of Muslims were killed during the siege. Historian Ganda Singh writes that allegations of desecrations of mosques are unfounded since the mausoleum of Shaikh Ahmad Mujaddid Alif Sani, which was the most magnificent buildings in the town, was left untouched after the battle. He further castigates the writers of the Siyar-ul-Mutakherin and Muntakhib-ul-Lubab for exaggerating Sikh atrocities, the statements of which were repeated by later writers like Mohammad Latif. He goes on to write that the Muslim populace, due to their affiliation with persecution and religious intolerance towards the poor and innocents, was subject to indiscriminate plunder by the crusaders impelled by the memory of the execution of Guru Gobind Singh's sons and that the host of plunderers and irregulars ravenously looted and avenged personal animosities. Only the Muslims who disguised themselves and hid themselves in the houses of Hindus were able to escape injury. Likewise the Hindus who were guilty of crimes against the innocents were punished and the city was spared from complete destruction as local Hindus appealed for forgiveness, and amnesty was granted to the city inhabitants after a large ransom was paid to Banda Singh Bahadur. Khafi Khan's and Latif's account of the siege has also been criticized by Dr. Harbans Sagoo, S.S. Gandhi, Sir Gokul Chand Narang, Thomas Henry Thornton as erroneous, lacking critical analysis and understanding, and on the basis of the chroniclers being Muslims and therefore ostensibly impartial to their regime. The New Cambridge History of India notes that the Sikhs massacred those who did not readily convert to Sikhism and destroyed the city buildings.

Aftermath
After the conquest of Sirhind, Banda Singh ousted the Muslim officers from all 28 parganahs of the Sirhind division and replaced them with his own men. He  appointed Baj Singh as the governor of Sirhind and Ali Singh of Salaudi as his deputy, and struck coins. Although the Mughals could regain control of the urban areas of Sirhind, they were unable to police the countryside, allowing Banda and his men to establish a parallel authority within those areas by levying taxes, raiding towns and trade routes and striking their own coinage. Banda Singh made Mukhlispur, an imperial fort now given the name of Lohgarh, the capital of Sikh state, made his own administrative arrangements, appointed  his own faujdars, diwans and kardars (revenue officers), and used his own inscripted authorized seal on his orders. He further abolished the zamindari system (feudal system) and distributed land among the farmers.

After the victory, due to the reports of intolerance and prejudiced treatment by Muslims from towns of Saharanpur, Behar, Nanautah and Jalalabad, Banda marched, plundered and chastised the oppressors. With the entire province of Sirhind under his possession, Banda Singh became popular as the defender of the faith and champion of the oppressors.

See also 
 Battle of Samana

References

Sikh warriors
Battles involving the Sikhs
Battles involving the Mughal Empire
1710 in Asia
1710 in military history
Persecution of Muslims